The Ministry of Natural Resources and Environmental Conservation is a Myanmar government ministry, founded by the merger of the Ministry of Mines and the Ministry of Environmental Conservation and Forestry by then-president Htin Kyaw in 2016.

Departments
Union Minister Office 
Forest Department 
Dry Zone Greening Department
Environmental Conservation Department
Survey Department
Myanmar Timber Enterprise
University of Forestry and Environmental Science
Department of Mines
Department of Geological Survey and Mineral Exploration
No. 1 Mining Enterprise
No. 2 Mining Enterprise 
Myanmar Gems Enterprise
Myanmar Pearl Enterprise

References 

NaturalResourcesEnvironmentalConservation
Myanmar
Myanmar
Myanmar
Forestry in Myanmar
Ministries established in 2016
2016 establishments in Myanmar